Sugarloaf Mountain is a summit located in the Adirondack Mountains of New York located in the Town of Benson north-northwest of the hamlet of Upper Benson.

References

Mountains of Hamilton County, New York
Mountains of New York (state)